Callechelys marmorata, also known as the marbled snake eel, is a  benthic marine fish belonging to the family Ophichthidae which refers to serpentine in shape fishes.

The Marbled snake eel  is a medium-sized fish which grows up to 87 cm.

It is widely distributed throughout the tropical waters of the Indian Ocean, Red Sea included, to the western Pacific Ocean.

It inhabits the sandy and muddy bottoms close to coastal reef from 1 until 37 m depth. 
The Marbled snake eel  has a nocturnal activity.

References

External links
http://www.marinespecies.org/aphia.php?p=taxdetails&id=217565
http://www.itis.gov/servlet/SingleRpt/SingleRpt?search_topic=TSN&search_value=635435
 

Eels
Ophichthidae
Fish described in 1854